George Washington Plunkitt (November 17, 1842 – November 19, 1924) was an American politician from New York State, who served in both houses of the New York State Legislature. He was a leader of the Tammany Hall political organization, a vehement critic of the Civil Service, and notably responsible for a series of colloquial and practical short talks recorded in "Plunkitt of Tammany Hall," which comprise his observations and successful mastery of machine politics.

Biography
He was born on November 17, 1842 in Manhattan, New York City.

He served in the New York State Assembly (New York Co., 17th D.) between 1869 to 1873.

He was a member of the New York State Senate from 1884 to 1887 (11th D.), in 1892 and 1893 (11th D.), and from 1899 to 1904 (17th D.). He sat in the 107th, 108th, 109th, 110th, 115th, 116th, 122nd, 123rd, 124th, 125th, 126th, and 127th New York State Legislatures.

Plunkitt became wealthy by practicing what he called "honest graft" in politics. He was a cynically honest practitioner of what today is generally known as "machine politics," patronage-based and frank in its exercise of power for personal gain.

In one of his speeches, quoted in Plunkitt of Tammany Hall, he describes the difference between dishonest and honest graft. For dishonest graft, one works solely for one's own interests. For honest graft, one pursues, at the same time, the interests of one's party, state, and person.

He made most of his money through the purchase of land that he knew would be needed for public projects. He would buy such parcels and then resell them at an inflated price. This was honest graft. Dishonest graft, according to Plunkitt, would be buying land and then using influence to have a project built on it.

Plunkitt defended his own actions, saying: "I could get nothin' at a bargain but a big piece of swamp, but I took it fast enough and held on to it. What turned out was just what I counted on. They couldn't make the park complete without Plunkitt's swamp, and they had to pay a good price for it. Anything dishonest in that?"

Plunkitt was also a thoroughgoing party man, believing in appointments, patronage, spoils, and all of the practices curtailed by the civil service law. He saw such practices as both the rewards and cause of patriotism. He hated the civil service system and fought against it politically.

Plunkitt is also remembered for the line he used to defend his actions: "I seen my opportunities and I took 'em."

On October 7, 1905, he underwent an operation for retro-peritoneal abscess, and almost died.

He died on November 19, 1924, in Manhattan, New York City. He was buried at the Calvary Cemetery in Queens.

References

Further reading
Riordon, William L., Plunkitt of Tammany Hall: A Series of Very Plain Talks on Very Practical Politics, Bedford Books of St. Martin's Press, 1993. (Originally published in 1905)

External links

History Matters
 
 
 
 

New York (state) state senators
1842 births
1924 deaths
Politicians from New York City
American political bosses from New York (state)
Members of the New York State Assembly
Burials at Calvary Cemetery (Queens)